Checkpoint was the name of the first rapid HIV testing facility in the Netherlands. This project, run on a voluntary basis, was based in Amsterdam. From 21 June 2002 until its closure on 27 June 2008 almost 5000 people opted for a Checkpoint HIV test.

The rapid HIV testing employed by Checkpoint was new for the Netherlands, because it was at that time not used by the various local health authorities. Such authorities and physicians employed the regular HIV antibody test and clients had to wait 1 or 2 weeks for the result. When an increasing number of local health authorities began using the rapid HIV test, Checkpoint had served its purpose and could be closed down. 

The rapid HIV test enabled a reliable outcome to be generated within 15 to 20 minutes, which in practice lowered the threshold for such testing. Because in this way more people opted for testing, more HIV-positive people could be reached. A clear advantage was that the diagnosis was made at the earliest possible stage of the infection, facilitating adequate treatment. In addition, through successful early treatment, the infectious period for HIV-positive people was reduced.

Background
Research conducted in 2000 revealed that in the Netherlands only 42% of men who had sex with men (MSM) had ever in their lives been tested for HIV, so the Dutch HIV Association (HVN) wanted to introduce a rapid test in the Netherlands to lower the threshold to get tested. GlaxoSmithKline provided financial assistance.

Aim
The rapid HIV test had to be on offer to everyone who had incurred a risk of HIV infection, irrespective of gender or sexual orientation. The testing procedure had to include comprehensive pre-test and post-test counselling. Knowledge gained from this form of testing had to be analyzed and eventually be communicated in a structured manner.

History
Initially, the mainstream bodies in this field, such as SOA Aids Nederland and the Municipal Health Services (GGD), were not immediately enthusiastic and regarded the initiative with some scepticism. The following initial objections had to be overcome:

 The Checkpoint had chosen for the Determine rapid HIV test, then the only reliable rapid HIV test available in the Netherlands. The reliability of this test had already been established but was not known to everyone.[1]
 Another criticism was that a positive result from a rapid HIV test was first confirmed by a Western blot (gold standard) and was, therefore, provisional. The CDC had observed around that time that 31% of positive results were not being collected.[2]
 More tenacious was the conviction that having to wait seven highly worrying days for the result of an HIV test would have a preventive effect, something for which no scientific basis was ever established. In practice, it turned out to be a matter of logistics. Testing a large number of blood samples simultaneously was cheaper: the cost per test was lower. Once the laboratory had initiated the testing procedure, the results from all blood samples were known within an hour. Additionally, the laboratories would suffer a loss in income if the testing localities required only the Western blots.

Clients quickly learned about Checkpoint, which meant that the low-threshold walk-in clinic soon had to be abandoned. During the first 26 Friday surgeries, demand was 20% higher than the then available 375 test spots. Clients regularly declared that they had been waiting years for such rapid testing.[3]

Recognition came in 2004 when, at the 15th World AIDS Conference in Bangkok, Checkpoint demonstrated that the rapid HIV test in the Netherlands lowered the threshold for MSM to have themselves tested, which meant that the second of Checkpoint's two aims had been realized.[4]

As of 2005, the Amsterdam City Council's public health service (the GGD) started offering rapid HIV tests to high-risk visitors to the STD Policlinic. At this moment, the first of Checkpoint's goals was also realized.

In 2006 the RIVM (Netherlands National Institute for Public Health and the Environment) advised the Ministry of Health to encourage the use of rapid HIV testing, to make an inventory of all obstacles to this, and to eliminate these obstacles.[5]

When 60% of the local health authorities appeared to be using rapid HIV testing as part of their standard screening method or were busy implementing it, this project could be successfully wound up. During an extensive farewell party on 27 June 2008, the then Mayor of Amsterdam, Job Cohen, thanked all volunteers for their results.

For one more year, foreign rapid HIV testing projects were supported. All source documentation was made available in digital form. The Checkpoint formula was adopted not only in the Netherlands but in many other cities: Aarhus, Athens, Barcelona, Basel, Cologne, Copenhagen, Dublin, Geneva, Helsinki, Lisbon, Ludwigshafen, Malmö, Mannheim, Munich, Nuremberg, Odense, Paris, Riga, Thessaloniki, Zagreb, and Zürich. The Checkpoints in Denmark, France, Sweden, and Switzerland received extensive support from Checkpoint Amsterdam. The Swiss Checkpoints have gone further, developing into Gay Health Centres. Not only do they perform tests for STDs and HIV, but they also offer support for HIV-positive persons and in general for coming out, general psychological care for gay men, training in safe drug usage, and assistance with smoking cessation and excessive alcohol use. In 2012 Checkpoints opened in Bern and Lausanne.[6]

Features of the Checkpoint formula
 
Checkpoint positioned itself as a facility which shares the client's point of view.  
 The rapid HIV test was used (the Amsterdam Checkpoint employed the Determine rapid HIV test (third generation), with a 100% sensitivity and 99.75% specificity)
 Positive or dubious results were checked using a Western blot test
 When an appointment is being made over the telephone, the client was asked whether he belongs to a high-risk group, what the reason is for wanting an HIV test and whether he is still in the window period for testing
 Outside office hours
 Gay-friendly, aimed at high-risk groups and anonymous if so desired 
 Preferably with the knowledge of and in the presence of the partner, friends and family, who can give effective support in the case of testing positive
 Effective pre- and post-test counselling 
 Information regarding safe sex, condom usage and sexual techniques
 Clients testing positive were immediately referred to a support project run by HIV-positive volunteers who, in various languages, offer support during the 48 hours after testing positive
 Vaccination against hepatitis A and B for groups at risk
 After testing, the Dutch HIV Association (HVN) Service Centre was available for advice or questions

Modus operandi of the Amsterdam Checkpoint
When the service began, everyone could attend without an appointment. However, demand exceeded supply, so it became necessary to work by appointment. HVN volunteers maintained the appointment schedule. When making an appointment over the phone, clients were asked whether or not they belonged to a high-risk group and about the risk they had experienced; they were informed about the window period. This information enabled a better match to be made between a doctor or nurse and the client for the Friday evening.

A volunteer trained in the paramedical field registered the client, talked about safe sex, and gave a condom demonstration.
 
After this, a nurse or doctor gave pre-test counselling, conducted the HIV test, and communicated the outcome 15 minutes later.

If the client tested positive or the result was ambiguous, a blood sample was taken for a Western blot and an appointment was made for receipt of the confirmatory result a week later.

In 79% of cases, the confirmatory result was received in person a week later. In contrast to the previous week, clients were noticeably less emotional at this second talk and had highly specific and practical questions to ask. Although initially a point of criticism, this second post-test talk was in fact regarded by the doctors, nurses, and clients as having added value.

Volunteers
This project was run by 43 volunteers. Once selected, volunteers followed an internal training programme, depending on their experience and duties, before being allowed to operate independently.
In 2007 Checkpoint became the second voluntary organization in Amsterdam and the 25th in the Netherlands to receive the Goed Geregeld [well organized] award from the Dutch Association of Voluntary Organizations (NOV): an award reflecting the high quality achieved.

Consultations and diagnoses
Content can be sorted per column using the arrows in the headings.
GGD Amsterdam refers to the local public health authority Gemeentelijke Gezondheidsdienst

It appears that, in the years of its operation as given above, Checkpoint was better able to reach higher-risk groups than was the Amsterdam Public Health Service (GGD).
In 2002 and 2008 Checkpoint was operational for 26 Friday evenings.
For comparison, the corresponding results per group are given for the Amsterdam Public Health Service's STD Policlinic. More detailed results (Dutch language) are to be found in '6 jaar Checkpoint, een samenvatting' [6 years of Checkpoint: a summary].

Trials

Detuned ELISA

Until early 2006 a Detuned ELISA test could still be requested in addition to a Western blot. This indicates whether the infections had occurred less than 6 months earlier or longer ago than this. It turned out that 63% of the infections were not recent.

General practitioners (family doctors) 

A few GPs used the rapid HIV test in their practice. They noted that this encouraged patients who were otherwise reluctant to face a general STD investigation.

Mister B

In this Amsterdam leather and fetish shop a surgery was held on Sunday afternoons. In this way Checkpoint hoped to reach more effectively the MSM who visited leather bars. This turned out not to be the case, but it was attractive for less well educated men who were taking high risks, regularly experimenting with recreational drugs and not resident in Amsterdam. The incidence rate among these clients was 5.6%.

Oral fluid

In collaboration with OraSure a pilot was conducted with 1000 OraQuick ADVANCE® Rapid HIV-1/2 oral fluid tests. Initially this appeared to form the ideal HIV self-test, but during this pilot two false-negative outcomes were discovered. In a slightly smaller-scale pilot in London a false-negative was noted on three occasions.

Resources

External links
 CDC website with information about rapid HIV testing, last consulted 30 January 2019. 
 From HIV-testing to Gay Health Centres: A Mapping of European "Checkpoints"

HIV/AIDS organizations